Aba may refer to:

Animals 
 Aba roundleaf bat
 Gymnarchus (or aba), an electric fish

Places

Africa 

 Aba, Nigeria
 Aba River (Nigeria)
 Aba Island, on Sudan's White Nile river

Asia 
 Aba (Russia), a river
 Aba, Okayama, Japan
 Aba Prefecture, Sichuan, China
 Aba County
 Aba, Sichuan
 Upu (also transliterated Aba), a historic region around Damascus

Europe 
 Aba, Democratic Republic of the Congo
 Aba, Hungary

People

Clans 
 Aba (family), in Hungary
 Aba people, in Russia

In arts and entertainment 
 Aba Bayefsky, Canadian artist and teacher
 Aba Cercato, Italian television presenter
 Vilmos Aba-Novák, a Hungarian painter

Rulers 
 Aba, ruler of Olba
 Samuel Aba, 11th-century Hungarian king

Other people 
 Aba Andam, Ghanaian physicist
 Johnny Aba (born 1956), a Papua New Guinean boxer

Religion and mythology 
 Aba (mythology), Hellenic Thracian naiad nymph
 Anglican Province of Aba, Nigeria
 Roman Catholic Diocese of Aba, Nigeria

Other uses 
 Aba (Dune), a robe in the fictional Dune universe
 Aba (film), a 2008 Sri Lanka film
 Aba Women's War, period of unrest in colonial Nigeria
 A short form of Abaya, a middle eastern robe

See also 
 
 Abaá, a Fang longhouse
 Abba (disambiguation)
 Abas (disambiguation)
 Ab (Semitic)